Dial 999 is a 1955 British crime drama film directed and written by Montgomery Tully based on the novel of the same name by Bruce Graeme. Produced by the British company, Todon Productions, it was shot at the Merton Park Studios in London.  RKO Radio Pictures purchased the rights to distribute it in the United States, where it was released in a cut form as The Way Out on 11 April 1956.  The film stars Gene Nelson as Greg Carradine, Mona Freeman as Terry Moffat Carradine, and John Bentley as Detective Sergeant Seagrave.

Cast

 Gene Nelson as Greg Carradine 
 Mona Freeman as Terry Carradine 
 John Bentley as Det. Sgt. Seagrave 
 Michael Goodliffe as John Moffat 
 Sydney Tafler as Cressett 
 Charles Victor as Tom Smithers 
 Paula Byrne as Vera Bellamy 
 Michael Golden as Inspector Keyes 
 Arthur Lovegrove as George 
 Charles Mortimer as Harding 
 Cyril Chamberlain as Anderson 
 Tony Sympson as Harry Briggs 
 Jack McNaughton as Plainclothes Officer 
 Michael Duffield as Fingerprint Man 
 Patrick Newell as 1st Brewers Man 
 Kay Callard as Blonde 
 Peter Welch as Plainclothes Officer 
 Margaret Harrison as Policewoman Larkins 
 Kenneth Midwood as Radio Operator
 Clifford Buckton as Alf 
 Frank Forsythe as 1st Police Constable 
 Frank Hawkins as 2nd Police Constable 
 Walter Gotell as Policeman 
 Harry Lane as Bob 
 Barbara Roscoe as Model

References

External links
 
 

1955 films
1955 crime drama films
British black-and-white films
British crime drama films
Films directed by Montgomery Tully
1950s English-language films
1950s British films